Teofila Băiașu (born 25 July 1927) is a Romanian gymnast. She competed in seven events at the 1952 Summer Olympics in Helsinki, Finland. She also participated in the 1954 World Artistic Gymnastics Championships in Rome, Italy, and in the 1956 Summer Olympics held in Melbourne, Australia, as part of the Romanian gymnastics team.

References

External links
 

1927 births
Possibly living people
Romanian female artistic gymnasts
Olympic gymnasts of Romania
Gymnasts at the 1952 Summer Olympics
Place of birth missing (living people)
Gymnasts at the 1956 Summer Olympics